Jörgen Grubb (born 1962) is a Swedish politician.  he serves as Member of the Riksdag representing the constituency of Östergötland County.

Grubb worked as a project manager for various business ventures before becoming a political organizer for the SD in Malmo. He previously served as the regional chairman for the SD in Malmo. In the Riksdag he is the member of the Finance Committee, the Justice Committee, the Constitution Committee, the Tax Committee, the Traffic Committee and the Education Committee.

References 

Living people
1962 births
Place of birth missing (living people)
21st-century Swedish politicians
Members of the Riksdag 2018–2022
Members of the Riksdag from the Sweden Democrats
Members of the Riksdag 2022–2026